"Why Didn't You Call Me" is a song by American singer Macy Gray from her debut studio album, On How Life Is (1999). It was released on July 24, 2000, as the album's fourth and final single.

Release
"Why Didn't You Call Me" became Gray's third consecutive top-40 entry on the UK Singles Chart, peaking at number 38. In the United States, the single reached number 25 on the Adult Top 40 chart and number 29 on the Top 40 Mainstream chart. However, the song missed the Billboard Hot 100, instead peakind at number seven on the Bubbling Under Hot 100 Singles chart.

"Why Didn't You Call Me" was released on two CD formats in the UK. The CD single contained remixes of "Why Didn't You Call Me" and "I've Committed Murder", along with a live recording of "I Can't Wait to Meetchu".

Music video
The music video, which depicts Gray performing in a dimly-lit room and shows close-ups of dancers, received significant play on BET, MTV, and VH1. The video entered the top 10 on VH1's most-played video chart.

Track listings

 UK CD1
 "Why Didn't You Call Me" – 3:14
 "I've Committed Murder" (Gang Starr remix featuring Mos Def—clean radio mix) – 4:38
 "Why Didn't You Call Me" (88-Keys remix) – 3:26

 UK CD2
 "Why Didn't You Call Me" – 3:14
 "I Can't Wait to Meetchu" (live at Brixton Academy, London, April 6, 2000) – 8:07
 "Why Didn't You Call Me" (Black Eyed Peas remix) – 2:56
 "Why Didn't You Call Me" (video)

 UK cassette single
 "Why Didn't You Call Me" – 3:14
 "Why Didn't You Call Me" (Gang Starr remix—clean radio mix) – 3:56
 "Why Didn't You Call Me" (live at Wembley Arena, London, April 5, 2000) – 3:35

 European CD1
 "Why Didn't You Call Me" – 3:14
 "I've Committed Murder" (Gang Starr remix featuring Mos Def—Main Street mix) – 4:37

 European CD2
 "Why Didn't You Call Me" – 3:14
 "Why Didn't You Call Me" (Black Eyed Peas remix) – 2:56
 "Why Didn't You Call Me" (88-Keys remix) – 3:26
 "Why Didn't You Call Me" (live at Wembley Arena, London, April 5, 2000) – 3:35
 "I Can't Wait to Meetchu" (live at Brixton Academy, London, April 6, 2000) – 8:07

 Australian CD single
 "Why Didn't You Call Me" – 3:14
 "Why Didn't You Call Me" (Black Eyed Peas remix) – 2:56
 "Why Didn't You Call Me" (live at Wembley Arena, London, April 5, 2000) – 3:35
 "I Can't Wait to Meetchu" (live at Brixton Academy, London, April 6, 2000) – 8:07
 "I've Committed Murder" (Gang Starr remix featuring Mos Def—Main Street mix) – 4:37
 "Why Didn't You Call Me" (video)

Credits and personnel
Credits are lifted from the On How Life Is album booklet.

Studios
 Recorded and mixed at Paramount Studios, Sunset Sound, and A&M Studios (Hollywood, California)

Personnel

 Macy Gray – lyrics, back-up vocals
 Jeremy Ruzumna – music, back-up vocals, piano, organ
 Dawn Beckman – back-up vocals
 Musiic Galloway – back-up vocals
 David Wilder – back-up vocals, bass
 Jinsoo Lim – guitars
 Arik Marshall – guitars
 Matt Chamberlain – drums, percussion
 Darryl Swann – drum programming
 Lenny Castro – percussion
 Andrew Slater – production
 Dave Way – recording, mixing

Charts

Release history

References

1999 songs
2000 singles
Epic Records singles
Macy Gray songs
Music videos directed by Hype Williams
Songs written by Jeremy Ruzumna
Songs written by Macy Gray